University, Florida, may refer to either of two census-designated places in the state of Florida, United States:

University, Hillsborough County, Florida
University, Orange County, Florida

See also
University of Florida
University Park, Florida